The Beggar Student is a 1936 German operetta film directed by Georg Jacoby and starring Fritz Kampers, Harry Hardt and Ida Wüst. It is an adaptation of the 1882 operetta Der Bettelstudent by Carl Millöcker. It was shot at the Babelsberg Studios of UFA in Potsdam. The film's sets were designed by the art directors Fritz Maurischat and Karl Weber.

Plot 
Poland in 1704: The country is ruled by the Saxon Elector August the Strong, who appointed Colonel Ollendorf as governor in Kraków. Professional ethics apply, nocturnal gatherings are prohibited. Ollendorf gives a ball, to which the impoverished Countess Nowalska and her two daughters Bronislawa and Laura are also invited. As always, Bronislawa is only interested in eating and dancing, which embarrasses the Countess. Laura, however, is swarmed by the men. Ollendorf also wants to dance with Laura, who eludes him. When he continues to press her and kisses her on the shoulder, Laura slaps him in the face because he is not befitting his status and is not a Pole either. He laughs about it, but secretly swears revenge.

Meanwhile, in Kraków, a mysterious man has appeared who is being hunted by the soldiers. The Pole Jan Janicki gives him shelter. The stranger introduces himself as Symon Rymanowicz. They soon realize that both of them care about the freedom of Poland, so Jan takes Symon to a gathering of loyal Poles who are planning the revolution. When the secret gathering of soldiers is broken up, Jan and Symon flee in a wagon that turns out to be the prison's supply wagon and is parked in the prison yard. Jan and Symon, who pretend to be beggar students, are arrested and sing the satirical song "Oh, I just kissed her on the shoulder" in prison for Colonel Ollendorf. He appears in prison and offers both of them a deal: they will help him with a masquerade and in return they will both be set free. The men agree.

Symon now becomes the rich world traveler Prince Wybicki and Jan pretends to be his secretary. Symon should get engaged to Laura, according to Ollendorf's plan, and then expose her as a beggar student after the engagement. In fact, however, Symon and Laura fall in love with each other and Bronislawa and Jan also become a couple. Meanwhile, Jan promises Ollendorf that he will unmask an important revolutionary if he receives a large sum of money for it. Jan uses the money that Ollendorf pays him to arm the revolutionaries. Symon and Laura's engagement takes place and Ollendorf triumphantly resolves the identities of Symon and Jan. However, both reveal that they are actually Duke Kasimir and Count Opalinski - the Nowalska sisters have married befitting their status. At the same time, the armed Poles stormed Ollendorf's palace, and Elector August informed him that he was going to give back the Polish royal dignity. At the same time, Symon/Duke Kasimir is informed by the rebel leader that he will apply for the royal crown. Poland is free and the Nowalska sisters have found their great love in Symon and Jan.

Cast

References

Bibliography

External links 
 

1936 films
German historical musical films
1930s historical musical films
1930s German-language films
Operetta films
Films based on operettas
Films directed by Georg Jacoby
Films set in Poland
Films set in the 1700s
Films of Nazi Germany
UFA GmbH films
German black-and-white films
1930s German films
Films shot at Babelsberg Studios